La. Ganesan Iyer (born 16 February 1945) is an Indian politician who is currently serving as the 19th Governor of Nagaland. He also served as the 17th Governor of Manipur since 27 August 2021 and also served additionally as Governor of West Bengal from 18 July 2022 to 17 November 2022. Prior to serving as governor, he was senior leader of Tamil Nadu Bharatiya Janata Party.

Early life 
He was born on February 16, 1945, as son of Ilakumirakavan and Alamelu into a Tamil Brahmin family. He grew with his brother after losing his father at a young age. He joined the RSS and left his job without getting married and returned to public life as a full-time activist.

Political career
Before being appointed the General Secretary of TN BJP unit, he was a Pracharak in RSS. He escaped from the police during The Emergency of the 1970s and lived in hiding for about a year. He then served as the National Secretary and then as the Vice President of BJP at the national level. Later he was selected as the President of BJP's Tamil Nadu state unit.

He is a former Member of Parliament in Rajya Sabha. He replaced the former union minister Najma Heptulla as a Member of parliament in Rajya Sabha from Madhya Pradesh.

Speech about sacrificing Tamil Nadu 
Ganesan's comments on protests launched by locals against extraction of hydrocarbons at Neduvasal village in Tamil Nadu sparked a controversy in 2017 when he said, “There is nothing wrong in sacrificing a state for the welfare of the country."

Governor of Manipur
On 22nd August 2021, he was appointed 17th Governor of Manipur by President of India Shri Ram Nath Kovind. He was sworn in as the 17th Governor of Manipur at the Darbar Hall of Raj Bhavan, Imphal on August 27, 2021. He was administered the oath of office by Honourable Chief Justice of Manipur High Court PV Sanjay Kumar. Chief Minister N. Biren Singh, Ministers, and legislators were present in the ceremonial function. He served in the post till 12th February 2023, after which Anusuiya Uikey was appointed to the post.

Attack on Kirubanidhi 
Kirubanidhi, the first Dalit president of the BJP in Tamil Nadu, along with La Ganesan went to Indore, Madhya Pradesh to participate in the BJP national council's meeting in 2003. After the meeting, La Ganesan allegedly started abusing Kirubanidhi verbally by calling his caste name. Even though Kirubanidhi tried to pacify him, Ganesan reportedly twisted Kirubanidhi's arm. Later on in an interview, Kirubanidhi said the fight was over the misuse of funds by La Ganesan that he had pointed out.

Additional Charge as Governor of West Bengal 
On 18 July 2022, Ganesan assumed the office of Governor of West Bengal, after nomination of Jagdeep Dhankhar as Vice-Presidential candidate by NDA coalition.

He was in involved in a controversy during his tenure for his act, by pushing Sunil Chhetri during the presentation ceremony of 2022 Durand Cup for a photo up opportunity.

References

|-

Bharatiya Janata Party politicians from Tamil Nadu
Living people
National Democratic Alliance candidates in the 2014 Indian general election
Rajya Sabha members from Madhya Pradesh
1945 births
Rajya Sabha members from the Bharatiya Janata Party
People from Thanjavur